The 2021–22 Texas A&M Aggies women's basketball team represented Texas A&M University in the 2021–22 NCAA Division I women's basketball season. The team's head coach is Gary Blair, who was in his nineteenth and final season at Texas A&M, as he announced his retirement effective at the end of the season. The team will play their home games at the Reed Arena in College Station, Texas, and in its tenth season as a member of the Southeastern Conference.

Previous season
The Aggies finished the 2020–21 season with a record of 25–3 (13–1 SEC), ranked fourth in the nation, and were regular season champions. They lost the SEC tournament semifinals round to Georgia. They received an at-large bid to the NCAA Division I Tournament, where they advanced to the Sweet Sixteen before losing to Arizona.

Roster

Schedule

|-
!colspan=6 style=|Exhibition 

|-
!colspan=6 style=|Non-conference regular season

|-
!colspan=6 style=|SEC regular season

|-

!colspan=6 style=| SEC Tournament

Rankings

*Coaches did not release a week 1 poll.

References

Texas A&M Aggies women's basketball seasons
Texas AandM
Texas AandM Aggies women's basketball
Texas AandM Aggies women's basketball